David Schneider (born 22 May 1963) is a British actor, comedian, and director, best known for playing Tony Hayers in the Alan Partridge franchise.

Early life
David Schneider was born in London, England on 22 May 1963 to a Jewish family. He was educated at the City of London School, an independent school for boys in the City of London, before going to Exeter College, Oxford, where he studied modern languages, and studied for a doctorate in Yiddish Drama. During his time at university, Schneider performed a predominantly physical comedy act that contrasted with the trend towards stand-up comedy in live performance comedy in the 1980s. It was at this time that he met Armando Iannucci, who in 1991 recruited him for news-radio spoof On the Hour. He is an avid fan of Arsenal F.C.

Career
He performed in the BBC Sketch show Up to Something (1990) with Shane Richie, Suzy Aitchison, Frances Dodge, & Lewis MacLeod (actor). 

Schneider performed in The Day Today, the television spin-off from On the Hour and also appeared in the spin-offs Knowing Me, Knowing You... with Alan Partridge and I'm Alan Partridge where he played the fictional BBC commissioning editor, Tony Hayers. In 1994, he made an appearance on Mr. Bean, in Back to School Mr. Bean, as the judo teacher. In 1996, Schneider wrote The Eleventh Commandment, a play for the Hampstead Theatre about a Jew marrying a gentile. In the late 1990s he appeared in the topical satire The Saturday Night Armistice (subsequently retitled The Friday Night Armistice) alongside Armando Iannucci and Peter Baynham. In 1997 and 2000, Schneider played the part of Bradley Wilson in the BBC sitcom The Peter Principle.

Schneider wrote the screenplay for the 2001 feature film All the Queen's Men, directed by Stefan Ruzowitzky and starring Matt LeBlanc and Eddie Izzard. Schneider has also performed in the BBC sitcom Gimme Gimme Gimme and appeared on BBC Radio 4 panel show The 99p Challenge. He had small roles in several movies, including The Saint, 28 Days Later, A Knight's Tale and Mission: Impossible, where he played the driver of the Eurotunnel train. In 2004, Schneider played Joseph Goebbels in the satirical tongue-in-cheek comedy Churchill: The Hollywood Years. Following this, in 2006 Schneider took his first lead role when he made Uncle Max, a series of 13 dialogue-free shorts for CITV. They focus on slapstick humour, with Schneider saying he wanted to be "a human cartoon".

In April 2008, he featured in an episode of Hotel Babylon as a magician, a character not dissimilar to Tony le Mesmer whom he played in an episode of Knowing Me, Knowing You... with Alan Partridge. Schneider provides the voice of Blink for the CBBC series One Minute Wonders. In 2008, he took part in BBC Three's Most Annoying People of 2008, relaying his views about celebrities including Prince William, Mark Ronson and Peaches Geldof. In 2009, Schneider explored his Yiddish heritage with a 30-minute documentary for BBC Radio 4, My Yiddisher Mother Tongue, with contributors including family members, academics, Colin Powell and Michael Grade.

He has written a play, called Making Stalin Laugh, based on the slaughter of the Moscow State Jewish Theatre on the orders of Joseph Stalin. He also directed a sitcom pilot in 2007 called Up Close and Personal, set in the offices of a celebrity magazine and starring Raquel Cassidy. The pilot was subsequently rejected by ITV2. In 2011, he played Soggy Sid in Horrid Henry: The Movie, and in 2012, appeared in ITV drama Whitechapel, series 3, as murder suspect and taxi driver Marcus Salter. His radio sitcom Births, Deaths and Marriages, set in a register office and starring himself, premiered on BBC Radio 4 in May 2012. In 2014, Schneider appeared in the fifth episode of the second season in the TV show Plebs portraying a slave auctioneer called Agorix. In 2017, Schneider wrote the screenplay of The Death of Stalin with Armando Iannucci.

Filmography

Film

Television

References

External links

official website captured by archive.today in 2013

1963 births
Living people
People educated at the City of London School
Alumni of Exeter College, Oxford
English male judoka
English Jews
English people of Jewish descent
English male comedians
English male film actors
English male television actors
English male voice actors
English television directors
Male actors from London
Jewish male comedians